Staphylus mazans, the mazans scallopwing, is a species of spread-wing skipper in the butterfly family Hesperiidae. It is found in Central America and North America.

Subspecies
These four subspecies belong to the species Staphylus mazans:
 Staphylus mazans ascaphalus Staudinger, 1876
 Staphylus mazans hayhurstii Edwards, 1870
 Staphylus mazans mazans
 Staphylus mazans tierra Evans, 1953

References

Further reading

 

Staphylus (butterfly)
Articles created by Qbugbot